Maureen Baker (born 1948) is a Canadian–New Zealand sociologist and an emeritus professor of the University of Auckland. She has been a Fellow of the Royal Society Te Apārangi since 2009. Baker's work focused on children, families and gender.

Academic career
Baker was born in 1948 in Toronto. She obtained a BA from the University of Toronto in 1970, and went on to complete an M.A. in 1972. Her PhD from the University of Alberta, in 1975, was titled Women as a Minority Group in the Academic Profession. For seven years, Baker was a policy adviser to the Canadian government. She also worked as an associate professor and professor at McGill University before moving to New Zealand in 1998.

Much of Baker's work compares family situations in the three former British colonies of Australia, Canada and New Zealand, in all of which she has worked. Baker has written eleven books and authored three others. Her book Families: Changing Trends in Canada has had six editions.  Baker retired in 2014, after sixteen years at Auckland University, and is an emeritus professor.

Awards and honours 
Baker was elected as a Fellow of the New Zealand Academy of the Humanities in 2008, and as a Fellow of the Royal Society Te Apārangi in 2009.

Selected works

References

Living people
New Zealand women academics
Canadian sociologists
Academic staff of the University of Auckland
1948 births
University of Alberta alumni
Fellows of the Royal Society of New Zealand
Academic staff of McGill University
University of Toronto alumni
New Zealand sociologists
Canadian emigrants to New Zealand